The Ukraine national under-20 football team is primarily a special team that is formed for the FIFA U-20 World Cup after a successful performance of the Ukraine national under-19 football team. The team is also used as an immediate reserve of the Ukraine national under-21 football team. In the 2019 FIFA U-20 World Cup Ukraine won their first title in the nation's history after defeating South Korea in the final.

It is formed by its head coach who is appointed and directed by the Ukrainian Association of Football, the governing body for football in Ukraine.

FIFA U-20 World Cup

 2001: Round of 16 (led by Anatoli Kroschenko)
Ukraine's top scorer at the tournament: Oleksiy Byelik 3 goals
Full squad list
 2005: Round of 16 (led by Oleksiy Mykhaylychenko)
Ukraine's top scorer at the tournament: Oleksandr Aliev 5 goals
Full squad list
 2015: Round of 16 (led by Oleksandr Petrakov)
Ukraine's top scorer at the tournament: Viktor Kovalenko 5 goals
Full squad list
 2019: Champions (led by Oleksandr Petrakov)
Ukraine's top scorer at the tournament: Danylo Sikan 4 goals
Full squad list

2019 FIFA U-20 World Cup (best Ukraine's result)

Group stage

Round of 16

Quarter-finals

Semi-finals

Final

Squad
The following 21 players have been called up to the 2019 FIFA U-20 World Cup.

Head coach: Oleksandr Petrakov

Honours
 FIFA U-20 World Cup: 2019

References

European national under-20 association football teams
Under-20
Youth football in Ukraine